Ameena Begum, popularly known as Dr. Ameena Shafiq, is a Bangladeshi politician and former member of parliament. She served as a member of the Jatiya Sangshad from 2001 to 2006, representing women's reserved seat-31 (national 331) for the Bangladesh Jamaat-e-Islami.

Background 
Ameena is a doctor.

References 

Living people
People from Sylhet
Bangladesh Jamaat-e-Islami politicians
8th Jatiya Sangsad members
Year of birth missing (living people)
21st-century Bangladeshi women politicians
Women members of the Jatiya Sangsad